Vaughn Dale Armstrong (born July 7, 1950) is an American actor. He is noted for portraying many characters in the Star Trek franchise, in four Star Trek television series. He is perhaps best known as the recurring character Admiral Maxwell Forrest in Star Trek: Enterprise. He has played twelve Star Trek characters.

In 1985, Armstrong portrayed drill instructor Sergeant Williams in a production of the play Tracers at the Coronet Theater in Los Angeles. In 1989, he played Father Larkin, a priest-principal of a Catholic school, in Stand-up Tragedy at the Mark Taper Forum in Los Angeles. In 1992 he appeared in an episode of Quantum Leap as Fred Trump (alongside his future Enterprise co-star Scott Bakula). In 2008, he had the role of Will Torrey, an American union representative in Ravensridge at the Fremont Centre Theatre in South Pasadena, California.

Filmography

Film

Television

Video games

Podcasts

References

External links
 
 Interview with Vaughn Armstrong & The Enterprise Blues Band on Slice of SciFi
 Vaughn Armstrong at Aveleyman

American male television actors
American male stage actors
American male film actors
1950 births
Living people
People from Sonora, California